Orange is an unincorporated community in Orange Township, Fayette County, Indiana, United States.

History
Orange was platted in 1824. It took its name from Orange Township. A post office was established at Orange in 1826, and remained in operation until it was discontinued in 1908.

Geography

References

Unincorporated communities in Fayette County, Indiana